Crossfield can refer to:

 Crossfield, Alberta
 Albert Scott Crossfield
 Magnetic crossfield effect